David Charles Onley  (June 12, 1950 – January 14, 2023) was a Canadian broadcaster and author who served as the 28th lieutenant governor of Ontario from 2007 until 2014.

Prior to his viceregal appointment, Onley was a television journalist. He worked primarily for Citytv as a weather reporter, before moving on to cover science and technology stories. Later on, he worked with the 24-hour news station CablePulse 24 as a news anchor and host of a weekly technology series, Home Page. A published author, he was the founding president of the Aerospace Heritage Foundation of Canada.

His seven-year term as Lieutenant Governor of Ontario makes him the province's third longest-serving viceroy since Confederation, behind his successor Elizabeth Dowdeswell (2014–present) and Albert Edward Matthews (1937–1946).

Early life
David Charles Onley was born in Midland, Ontario, on June 12, 1950. Beginning at the age of three, he battled with polio, resulting in partial paralysis. In order to facilitate medical treatment, the family moved to Scarborough (now part of Toronto), settling on Orchard Park Drive in the neighbourhood of West Hill. As a result of extensive physical therapy, he regained the use of his hands and arms, and partial use of his legs. Onley was able to get around using leg braces, canes, crutches, and his electric scooter. He was able to drive a car using hand controls.

He was educated at the University of Toronto Scarborough, served as student council president, and graduated in 1975 with an honours Bachelor of Arts degree and specialist certificate in political science. He then attended the University of Windsor Law School from 1976 to 1977, but did not complete the degree.

Career
Unable to find full time employment after his graduation, Onley turned to writing, publishing Shuttle: A Shattering Novel of Disaster in Space, a bestselling novel about space travel, in 1981. It was nominated by the Periodical Distributors of Canada as book of the year in 1982. 

While promoting the book, Onley positioned himself as a space program expert, leading to a career in radio. He began hosting a weekly science show for Toronto radio station CFRB, subsequently joining the CKO network in 1983. He then joined Citytv in 1984 as weather specialist, a position he held until 1989. In a 2004 interview with Link Up, a Toronto employment agency for people with disabilities, Onley stated that

From 1989 to 1995, he was the first news anchor on the then-new Breakfast Television, Citytv's morning show. He served as education specialist for Citytv from 1994 to 1999. Onley became an anchor on Citytv's sister station CP24 upon its launch in 1998, and both hosted and produced Home Page on CP24.

He was one of Canada's first on-air television personalities with a visible disability; he used a mobility device due to his paralysis. Camera shots began with only upper body shots, but Onley demanded that the shot include him in his mobility device. In honour of his contributions to the advancement of disability issues in Canada, he has received awards from the Terry Fox Hall of Fame in 1997, and the Clarke Institute's Courage to Come Back award. He was appointed Chair of the Accessibility Standards Advisory Council to the Minister of Community and Social Services in 2005. He was inducted into the Scarborough Walk of Fame in 2006.

Onley returned to his acting roots, with a cameo appearance in the sixth season of the Canadian TV series Murdoch Mysteries. The episode, "The Ghost of Queens Park" aired in Canada on February 25, 2013.  In it he played the eighth Lieutenant Governor of Ontario, Sir Oliver Mowat. He also served as founding president of the Aerospace Heritage Foundation of Canada.

As Lieutenant Governor

Onley's appointment as Lieutenant Governor was announced on July 10, 2007; he was privately informed of this after a July 4, 2007, taping of Home Page: "I just had reached the top of the Don Valley Parkway... and there was no place to pull over. And when the Prime Minister of your country calls, all you can try to do is stay in the same lane, avoid any fender-benders and have a meaningful conversation, which I did."

He was sworn in on September 5, 2007, at Queen's Park in Toronto. As the province's first Lieutenant Governor with a disability, Onley said he would use his vice-regal position to help remove physical barriers to Ontario's 1.5 million people with disabilities, as well as focus on other issues affecting the disabled, including obstacles to employment and housing.  Onley also stated, in his installation speech, that he would expand on his immediate predecessor James Bartleman's First Nations literacy initiatives, his aim being to see computers on every student's desk in northern schools. For his installation, Onley approached the legislature on his electric scooter, however he ascended the Throne on foot, using leg braces and canes. 

During Onley's mandate, he participated in 2550 engagements, during which he spoke to an estimated audience of over one million people. He travelled to China to represent the Queen and Canada at the 2008 Summer Paralympics opening ceremony. Onley delivered his last speech from the throne to the Ontario Legislative Assembly on July 3, 2014; his last full day in office was September 22, 2014, with his successor sworn in the following afternoon.

Onley and his wife resided in their Scarborough home during his vice-regal tenure, as Ontario is one of three provinces that does not have an official vice-regal residence.

Post-viceregal life
Onley was appointed senior lecturer in the Department of Political Sciences at University of Toronto Scarborough (UTSC), his alma mater. His appointment began on October 1, 2014. At UTSC he also  served as special
advisor on disability issues, encouraging the development of new initiatives including the founding of the Centre for Global Disability Studies. He also served as the University's Special Ambassador for the 2015 Pan American and Parapan American Games.

In 2018, Onley was appointed to review the act and conducted public consultations on the Accessibility for Ontarians with Disabilities Act (AODA). Onley conducted extensive consultations, and delivered a written Legislative Review of the AODA in 2019, available online. In the report, Onley raises concerns that based on consultations with disabled citizens and their family members, the province is not on track to meet 2025 AODA goals.  The report offers concrete recommendations for improved implementation of the AODA, including calls to address the intersection of disability and poverty, and the need to take an "all-of-government approach by making accessibility the responsibility of every ministry" and clarify the relationship of the AODA to the Ontario Human Rights Code.

Personal life and death
Onley was married to Ruth Ann, a Christian music performer. They have three sons, Jonathan, Robert and Michael. In late 2019, Onley received emergency medical treatment after a brain scan revealed that he had a tumour the size of an orange at the front of his brain, which was successfully removed.

Onley died at Sunnybrook Hospital in Toronto on January 14, 2023, aged 72. He is survived by his wife and three children. He was accorded an Ontario state funeral; following two days of lying in state at the Ontario Legislative Building, his funeral was held on January 30 at Yorkminster Park Baptist Church. Those in attendance included his successor Lieutenant Governor Elizabeth Dowdeswell and Premier of Ontario Doug Ford.

Honours and awards

Ribbon bars

Other distinctions
He served as Colonel of the Regiment of The Queen's York Rangers in his capacity of Lieutenant Governor.
He was the Honorary Colonel of 25 Field Ambulance in a personal capacity.
Midland has a David Onley Park, dedicated on his 63rd birthday (June 12, 2013).

Coat of arms

Bibliography
 Shuttle: A Shattering Novel of Disaster in Space (1981)  (book),  (audio edition)

See also
 Monarchy in Canada
 Monarchy in Ontario

References

External links

 Biography of David Onley – The Canadian Encyclopedia
 David Onley's End of Mandate Report (PDF file)
 Lieutenant Governor of Ontario
 Entry at isfdb.org

1950 births
2023 deaths
Canadian Protestants
Canadian radio hosts
Canadian science fiction writers
Canadian television news anchors
Canadian television journalists
Citytv people
Journalists from Ontario
Knights of Justice of the Order of St John
Lieutenant Governors of Ontario
Members of the Order of Ontario
Writers from Ontario
People from Midland, Ontario
Canadian Disability Hall of Fame
University of Toronto alumni
People with polio
Canadian politicians with disabilities
Canadian male novelists
20th-century Canadian novelists
21st-century Canadian politicians
Members of the Order of Canada